Manuel Delgado Ruiz (b. Barcelona, 1956) is a Catalan anthropologist.

He graduated from the University of Barcelona with a degree in Art History and later obtained a doctorate in anthropology there. He continued his graduate studies at the Religious Sciences department of the École Pratique des Hautes Études at the Sorbonne. Since 1986, he has been Professor of Religious Anthropology in the Department of Social Anthropology at his alma mater.

He was the editor of the "Biblioteca del Ciudadano" (Citizen's Library) at Ediciones Bellaterra and the "Breus Classics d'Antropologia" series at Editorial Icaria. He served as a member of the management committee for the journal Quaderns de l´ICA and currently sits on the managing board of the Institut Català d'Antropologia. He is also involved in political issues, serving as speaker of the "Study Commission on Immigration" in the Parliament of Catalonia. Religious and ritual violence has been one of his particular areas of interest, as well as the apportioning of public space and the construction of collective identities in an urban context.

Selected works
 De la Muerte de un Dios: La Fiesta de los Toros en el Universo Simbólico de la Cultura Popular , Península (1986) 
 La Ira Sagrada. Anticlericalismo, Iconoclastia y Antiritualismo en la España Contemporánea, Humanidades (1992) 
 Las Palabras de Otro Hombre. Anticlericalismo y Misoginia, Muchnik (1993) 
 El Animal Público. Hacia una Antropología de los Espacios Urbanos, Anagrama (1999) 
 Elogi del Vianant, Edicions de 1984 (2005) 
 Sociedades Movedizas. Pasos Hacia una Antropología de las Calles, Anagrama (2007) 
 El Espacio Público como Ideología, La Catarata (2011)

References

External links
 "El Cor de los Aparences", Delgado's blog
 Guerrilla Comunicacional: Interview with Manuel Delgado
 MediaLab Prado: "The Common and the Collective. Public Space As a Space of and for Communication", a presentation by Delgado
 "Manuel Delgado’s Urban Anthropology: From Multidimensional Space to Interdisciplinary Spatial Theory" by Benjamin Fraser. Arizona Journal of Hispanic Cultural Studies, Volume 11, 2007

Living people
Spanish anthropologists
1956 births
University of Barcelona alumni
Academic staff of the University of Barcelona